This is a list of Belgian football transfers for the 2010 summer transfer window. Only transfers involving a team from the Jupiler League are listed.

The summer transfer window will open on 1 July 2010, although some transfers took place prior to that date. Players without a club may join one at any time, either during or in between transfer windows. The transfer window ends on 31 August 2010, although a few completed transfers could be announced a few days later.

Sorted by date

February 2010

March 2010

April 2010

May 2010

 1 Guedioura was already on loan to Wolverhampton since the winter of 2009-2010, but Wolverhampton chose to use the option to buy in the contract.
 2 Mujangi Bia was already on loan to Wolverhampton since the winter of 2009-2010. This loan contract ended, but Wolverhampton and Charleroi agreed to renew the loan for another season.
 3 Both Mukendi and Reynaldo were already on loan to Cercle. The loan ended, but was extended for one more season.
 4 Kruiswijk returned from a loan spell at Roda JC, but was immediately sold to Heerenveen.
 5 Leko was already on loan from Germinal Beerschot for half a season, however both clubs agreed upon a full transfer.
 6 El Araichi was already on loan to Kortrijk. The loan ended, but El Araichi was now signed on a full contract.
 7 Verbauwhede was already on loan to Kortrijk. The loan ended, but was extended for one more season.

End of 2009-10 season
After the end of the 2009-10 season, several players have returned from loan to another club or did not have had their contracts extended. They are listed here when the date is otherwise not specified. For a list of transfers where the returned players are also mentioned, see.

June 2010

 8 Ciman was on loan to Kortrijk. The loan ended, but he was sold to Standard Liège.
 9 Ciza was already on loan to Charleroi. The loan was extended for one more season.
 10 Van der Jeugt was on loan to RFC Liège, the loan ended but instead of returning he was immediately sold to Sint-Truiden.

July 2010

 11 Capon was already on loan to Kortrijk. This loan ended, but now he was sold.
 12 Šćepović was on loan to Sampdoria, now sold to Brugge.
 13 Espinal was on loan to Giacomense, now sold to Eupen.
 14 Gent and Olufadé agreed to terminate the contract just before the start of the season. Olufadé immediately signed for Charleroi, who thus did not have to pay a transfer fee.
 15 Losada was on loan to Heerenveen, now loaned to Charleroi.
 16 Gent and Pieroni agreed to terminate the contract. Pieroni then signed for Standard, who thus did not have to pay a transfer fee.

August 2010

 17 Matthys returned from a loan spell at Lierse, but in agreement between him and Zulte-Waregem, his contract was annulled and he was released. A few days later, Matthys signed for Mons.
 18 Makiese was on loan and returned to Lille, who sold him to Laval.
 19 Yakovenko was already on loan to Westerlo during the previous season. The loan ended in June but was now renewed for one more season.

September 2010

Sorted by team

Anderlecht

In:

Out:

Cercle Brugge

In:

Out:

Charleroi

In:

Out:

Club Brugge

In:

Out:

Eupen

In:

Out:

Racing Genk

In:

Out:

Gent

In:

Out:

Germinal Beerschot

In:

Out:

Kortrijk

In:

Out:

Lierse

In:

Out:

Lokeren

In:

 

 
 

Out:

Mechelen

In:

Out:

Sint-Truiden

In:

 

 

Out:

Standard Liège

In:

Out:

Westerlo

In:

 
 
 
 
 

Out:

Zulte Waregem

In:

Out:

References

Belgian
Transfers Summer
2010 Summer